Coleophora glycyrrhizae is a moth of the family Coleophoridae. It is found in Kazakhstan.

The larvae have been observed to eat Glycyrrhiza glabra and Meristotropis triphylla. They feed on the leaves of their host plant.

References

glycyrrhizae
Moths described in 1989
Moths of Asia